Saad Wasim (born 28 July 1975) is a Pakistani first-class cricketer who played for Karachi cricket team.

References

External links
 

1975 births
Living people
Pakistani cricketers
Karachi cricketers
Karachi Port Trust cricketers
Cricketers from Karachi